Sorrow may refer to:

 Sorrow (emotion)
 Sorrow (Van Gogh), an 1882 drawing by Vincent van Gogh
 "Sorrow" (Bad Religion song), 2001
 "Sorrow" (The McCoys song), also covered by The Merseys and David Bowie
 "Sorrow" (Pink Floyd song), 1987
 "Sorrow", a song by Box Car Racer from Box Car Racer (2002)
 "Sorrow", a song by Life Without Buildings from Any Other City (2001)
 "Sorrow", a song by the National from High Violet (2010)
 The Sorrow, an Austrian metalcore/melodic death band
 The Sorrow (album), a 2010 album by The Sorrow
 The Sorrows, a 1960s English freakbeat band
 The Sorrow (Metal Gear), a fictional character in the Metal Gear video game series